American National University, formerly National Business College, is a private for-profit university with multiple campuses in the United States, including Indiana, Kentucky, Ohio, Tennessee, Virginia, and West Virginia.

History
The university was founded in 1886 as a business school in Roanoke, Virginia. It later expanded to a national business school and developed multiple campuses.

Academics
The university offers master's degrees, bachelor's degrees, associate degrees, diploma programs, certificate programs, and professional training and certifications. It is institutionally accredited by the Distance Education Accrediting Commission (DEAC).

Campuses
American National University has campuses in 30 cities across six states, including Indiana, Kentucky, Ohio, Tennessee, Virginia, and West Virginia.

References

External links
 

Education in Charlottesville, Virginia
Education in Danville, Virginia
Education in Harrisonburg, Virginia
Education in Lynchburg, Virginia
Education in Martinsville, Virginia
Education in Roanoke County, Virginia
Education in Wood County, West Virginia
Education in Mercer County, West Virginia
Private universities and colleges in Virginia
Private universities and colleges in West Virginia
1886 establishments in Virginia
For-profit universities and colleges in the United States
Educational institutions established in 1886
Distance Education Accreditation Commission